The First Congregational Church is a historic church building in the Marcy-Holmes neighborhood of Minneapolis, Minnesota, United States, built in 1886.  It is constructed of red sandstone in Gothic-Romanesque style, featuring round-arched windows and semi-circular rows of pews.  When initially completed, the building was in a residential neighborhood surrounded by mansions of prominent citizens and merchants of the time, including Octavius Broughton, Woodbury Fisk, Thomas Andrews, Horatio P. Van Cleve, William McNair, and John Dudley. Over time the neighborhood changed to a more transient population, dominated by students attending the University of Minnesota.  Architect Warren H. Hayes (1847-1899) was Minneapolis' leading designer of churches in the 19th century, having designed the Calvary Baptist Church, Fowler Methodist Episcopal Church, and Wesley Methodist Episcopal Church, as well as the Central Presbyterian Church in Saint Paul.

Hubert Humphrey, 38th Vice President of the United States, was a member of this congregation.

References

External links

19th-century United Church of Christ church buildings
Churches completed in 1886
Churches in Minneapolis
Churches on the National Register of Historic Places in Minnesota
National Register of Historic Places in Minneapolis
Romanesque Revival church buildings in Minnesota
United Church of Christ churches in Minnesota